John Cox Wickwire (December 21, 1899 – August 20, 1994) was a Canadian politician. He represented the electoral district of Queens in the Nova Scotia House of Assembly from 1974 to 1978. He was a member of the Progressive Conservative Party of Nova Scotia.

Born in 1899 at Milford, Nova Scotia, Wickwire was a graduate of Dalhousie University, and Harvard Medical School. He married Dorothy Charlotte Fraser in 1929. Dr. John C. Wickwire Academy in Liverpool, Nova Scotia is named in his honour.

A member of Liverpool Town Council for five years, Wickwire entered provincial politics in the 1974 election, winning the Queens riding by 256 votes. He served one term, and did not reoffer in the 1978 election. Wickwire died on August 20, 1994, in Liverpool.

References

1899 births
1994 deaths
Progressive Conservative Association of Nova Scotia MLAs
People from Hants County, Nova Scotia
People from Queens County, Nova Scotia
Dalhousie University alumni
Harvard Medical School alumni
Nova Scotia municipal councillors